Adult Children is a 1961 Soviet comedy film directed by Villen Azarov.

Plot 
Pensioner Korolyov Anatoly Kuzmich move to a new apartment. Everything is great with him and his wife and their future life seems to be just as wonderful until their daughter gets married and gives a birth to child.

Cast 
 Aleksey Gribov as Anatoly Kuzmich Korolyov
 Zoya Fyodorova as Tatyana Ivanova
 Liliya Aleshnikova as Lysusya
 Aleksandr Demyanenko as Igor
 Vsevolod Sanaev as Vasili Vasilyevich
 Andrey Tutyshkin as Boris Vladimirovich
 Gennadiy Bortnikov

References

External links 
 

1961 films
1960s Russian-language films
Soviet teen films